The upper part of the posterior district of the medulla oblongata is occupied by the inferior cerebellar peduncle, a thick rope-like strand situated between the lower part of the fourth ventricle and the roots of the glossopharyngeal and vagus nerves.

Each cerebellar inferior peduncle connects the spinal cord and medulla oblongata with the cerebellum, and comprises the juxtarestiform body and restiform body.

Important fibers running through the inferior cerebellar peduncle include the dorsal spinocerebellar tract and axons from the inferior olivary nucleus, among others.

Function
The inferior cerebellar peduncle carries many types of input and output fibers that are mainly concerned with integrating proprioceptive sensory input with motor vestibular functions such as balance and posture maintenance. It consists of the following fiber tracts entering cerebellum: 
 Posterior spinocerebellar tract: unconscious proprioceptive information from the lower part of trunk and lower limb. This tract originates at the ipsilateral Clarke's nucleus (T1-L1) and travels upward to reach  the inferior cerebellar peduncle and synapses within the spinocerebellum (also known as the paleocerebellum). 
 Cuneocerebellar tract: unconscious proprioceptive information from the upper limb and neck. This tract originates at the ipsilateral accessory cuneate nucleus and travels through the inferior cerebellar peduncle to reach the spinocerebellum part of the cerebellum. 
 Trigeminocerebellar tract: unconscious proprioceptive information from the face. 
 Olivocerebellar tract: "error signal" in movement originates from the cerebral cortex and spinal cord. This tract originates at contralateral inferior olivary nucleus and enters the cerebellum as a climbing fiber. 
 Vestibulocerebellar tract: vestibular information projects onto the vestibulocerebellum (also known as the archicerebellum). 
This peduncle also carries information leaving cerebellum: from the Purkinje cells to the vestibular nuclei in the dorsal brainstem located at the junction between the pons and medulla oblongata.

See also
 Cerebral peduncle
 Juxtarestiform body
 Middle cerebellar peduncles
 Superior cerebellar peduncles

Additional images

References

External links
 
 
 

Brainstem
Cerebellar connections